Marquis (marquess) is a hereditary title of nobility.

Marquis may also refer to:

People
 Marquis (name), people with the surname or given name
 Marquis Cor Von, ring name briefly used by professional wrestler Monty Brown (b. 1970)

Places
Marquis, Grenada, a town in Grenada
Marquis, Edmonton, Alberta, Canada
Marquis, Saskatchewan, a Canadian village
Rural Municipality of Marquis No. 191, Saskatchewan

Arts and entertainment
Marquis (film), a 1989 film
Marquis (magazine), a fetish magazine
Marquis (quartet), barbershop quartet that won the 1995 SPEBSQSA international competition
"Marquis" (song), 2013 song by Danish rapper L.O.C.
The Marquis (comics), a comic series published Oni Press (later Dark Horse), written by Guy Davis

Other uses
Marquis Theatre, located on the third floor of the New York Marriott Marquis hotel
Marquis Miami, a skyscraper in Miami, Florida
Marquis Who's Who, a biographical publisher
Marquis (custom car), built by Bill Cushenbery
Marquis reagent, used as a simple spot-test to identify alkaloids
Mercury Marquis, a luxury car
Marquis wheat, a variety of Red Fife wheat
Trade name of ponazuril, a veterinary drug

See also

Marquis River (disambiguation)
 Marquise (disambiguation), feminine of marquis
 Marquess (disambiguation)
 Margrave (disambiguation), equivalent of marquis
 Markgraf (disambiguation), equivalent of marquis
Marquee (disambiguation)
Maquis (disambiguation)
Marques (disambiguation)
Marque (disambiguation)